Fatna Maraoui (born 10 July 1977) is a born Moroccan female Italian long-distance runner who competed at two editions of the IAAF World Cross Country Championships at senior level (2008, 2011). and also two of editions the IAAF World Half Marathon Championships (2011, 2014).

She is the sister of Rakiya Maraoui-Quétier born Moroccan female French long-distance runner, ten years older, former member of the France national athletics team.

Biography
Naturalized by marriage from 2003. She won three editions of the absolute Italian Championship in the 10 km road race.

National titles
 Italian 10 km road Championship
 10 km road race: 2016, 2017, 2019

See also
 Italian all-time lists - Half marathon
 Naturalized athletes of Italy

References

External links

1977 births
Living people
Italian female long-distance runners
Athletics competitors of Gruppo Sportivo Esercito
Italian female marathon runners
Moroccan emigrants to Italy
Naturalised citizens of Italy
Italian Athletics Championships winners
Italian sportspeople of African descent